The 2020 Northern Territory general election was held on 22 August 2020 to elect all 25 members of the Legislative Assembly in the unicameral Northern Territory Parliament.

Members were elected through full preferential instant-runoff voting in single-member electorates, after the optional preferential voting system introduced for the 2016 election was abolished by the Electoral Legislation Amendment Act 2019 in April 2019. The election was conducted by the Northern Territory Electoral Commission, an independent body answerable to Parliament.

The incumbent centre-left Labor Party (ALP) majority government, led by Chief Minister Michael Gunner, won a second consecutive four-year term of government. It defeated the centre-right Country Liberal Party (CLP) opposition, led by Opposition Leader Lia Finocchiaro, and the regionalist big-tent Territory Alliance (TA) party, led by former Chief Minister Terry Mills.

ABC election analyst Antony Green called the election for the Labor Party nearly three hours after the polls closed. At the time it was not known if the party would claim a majority of seats, though on 24 August the ABC projected Labor had retained majority government. When the counting of votes concluded, Labor finished with 14 seats, enough for a two-seat majority on the floor of the Assembly. The Country Liberals won 8 seats, a gain of six from their landslide loss in the previous election, whilst 2 independents and 1 Territory Alliance candidate were elected. The new Gunner Ministry was sworn in on 8 September 2020.

Results

Results summary

The CLP regained a number of seats in traditional heartlands that it had lost to Labor in 2016, with the party winning back Braitling, Brennan and Katherine from the ALP. It also won the outback seats of Barkly and Namatjira by narrow margins. The ALP maintained its dominance of the Darwin/Palmerston area, holding all but two of the region's seats–accounting for almost all of its majority. The ALP managed to consolidate some of its gains from 2016. It retained Port Darwin and Drysdale, two seats it had only won once before 2016, while gaining Blain, a seat it had never won before. The ALP also won a majority of the two-party vote for only the third time ever in a Territory election.

Both incumbent independent MLAs running for reelection, Yingiya Mark Guyula and Kezia Purick, retained their seats, but long-serving independent Gerry Wood was succeeded by a CLP candidate in Nelson. The Territory Alliance won a single seat, with Robyn Lambley narrowly holding her seat of Araluen; party leader Terry Mills and Jeff Collins both lost their seats.

Seats changing hands
Members in italics did not re-contest their seats at this election. Margins are notional estimates by Antony Green.

 *Due to boundary changes, Namatjira was notionally CLP at the time of this election.

Background

Previous election
At the 2016 election, the one-term incumbent Country Liberal Party (CLP) minority government, led by Chief Minister Adam Giles, was defeated by the Labor Party Opposition, led by Opposition Leader Michael Gunner. The CLP suffered the worst defeat of a sitting government in the history of the Territory, and one of the worst defeats of a sitting government in the history of Australia. It was the first time that a sitting Northern Territory government was defeated after only one term. From 11 seats at dissolution (and 16 after the 2012 election), the CLP suffered the worst election performance in its history, winning only two seats. Labor won 18 seats, in the process winning the third-largest majority government in Territory history. Independents won five seats. With only two members in the CLP caucus, Gary Higgins became opposition leader and CLP leader while Lia Finocchiaro became deputy CLP leader on 2 September. Although the independent MPs outnumbered the CLP MPs, on official advice the CLP was recognised as the official opposition.

Additionally, Giles lost his seat of Braitling to Labor, making him only the second Chief Minister/Majority Leader to lose their seat at an election. Along with the seat of Katherine, the election represented the first time Labor had won a seat in Alice Springs or Katherine.

With the overall result beyond doubt, Gunner had himself, Natasha Fyles, and Nicole Manison sworn in as an interim three-person government on 31 August until the full Gunner Ministry could be sworn in on 12 September.

The position of Speaker of the Northern Territory Legislative Assembly had been held by former CLP-turned-independent MP Kezia Purick since 23 October 2012. Despite Labor's massive majority following the 2016 election, the incoming Labor government re-appointed Purick as Speaker.

Labor expulsions
The composition of the Assembly was unchanged for over two years, with Labor Party holding 18 seats, the Country Liberal Party two and the remaining five by independents. In December 2018, the Labor Government dismissed three sitting members of the parliamentary party; the Aboriginal Affairs Minister Ken Vowles, Assistant Minister Jeff Collins and backbencher Scott McConnell. The trio were dismissed after publicly criticising the government's handling of the territory's long-term economic situation, following a report finding the budget to be in "structural deficit" with expenditure struggling to cover previous borrowings and day-to-day costs. They consequently became independents and sat on the crossbench. McConnell later announced he would not re-contest his seat at the election, though did end up running for the adjacent seat of Braitling.

Territory Alliance founding
In August 2019, Terry Mills, the independent member for the seat of Blain, announced the formation of a new regionalist big tent party known as Territory Alliance. Mills had previously been the leader of the CLP and was Chief Minister of the Northern Territory following the Country Liberal Party's (CLP) victory at the 2012 election. He was usurped for the leadership of the party by Adam Giles only six months into his Chief Ministership, defeated 11–5 in a party-room ballot. With Mills' presence in the Assembly, the new Territory Alliance held one seat. This increased to three seats in March 2020 when Jeff Collins (expelled by Labor in December 2018) and Robyn Lambley (the former deputy CLP leader who was re-elected as an independent in 2016) announced they had joined the party, taking Territory Alliance's representation in the Assembly to three seats. With more members in the Assembly than the CLP, Alliance sought to claim official opposition status, though they were defeated 5–3 in a secret Assembly ballot of non-Government MPs and the CLP retained opposition status, with Lia Finocchiaro remaining as Opposition Leader.

Johnston by-election
With Scott McConnell having announced his retirement at the election and Jeff Collins becoming a member of the Territory Alliance, Ken Vowles, the remaining member of the Labor trio to be expelled by the party, announced his immediate resignation from the Assembly in November 2019. This decision necessitated a by-election in the seat of Johnston to replace Vowles. The by-election was held on 29 February 2020 and was won by Labor candidate Joel Bowden, who claimed 52.6% of the two-candidate preferred vote. Labor's primary vote collapsed more than 21 points, making the seat a marginal contest at the general election. The Territory Alliance candidate usurped the Greens and CLP candidates into second place (47.4% of the two-candidate preferred vote), with the CLP primary vote dropping by more than 15 points and the party finishing in fourth place.

Election date
The parliament has fixed four-year terms, with elections to be held on the fourth Saturday of August every four years.

Key dates
Key dates in relation to the election were:
 30 July 2020: Issue of the writ
 30 July 2020: Nominations for candidates opened
 31 July 2020: Electoral roll for voters closed (5:00 pm)
 6 August 2020: Nominations for candidates closed
 6 August 2020: Declaration of nominations and candidate positions on ballot papers
 10 August 2020: Early voting and mobile voting commenced
 10 August 2020: Applications for postal voting opened
 20 August 2020: Postal voting dispatches ceased
 21 August 2020: Last day for early voting
 22 August 2020: Polling Day
 4 September 2020: Last day for receipt of postal votes
 7 September 2020: Declaration of election result
 TBD: Return of writ

Redistribution

A boundary redistribution for electoral divisions in the Northern Territory commenced on 27 February 2019, with the boundary commission releasing its report of the final boundaries on 4 September 2019.

Two seats were renamed: Nhulunbuy became Mulka, and Stuart became Gwoja (after Gwoya Tjungurrayi).
The boundaries of the electoral division of Katherine had historically been matched to those of the Katherine Town Council for a number of years, although the direct enrolment update program by the Australian Electoral Commission had increased enrolment numbers, bringing the division 11.5% over quota. RAAF Base Tindal and the suburb of Venn were consequently transferred to the division of Arnhem.
The seat of Gwoja (formerly Stuart) was extended south to the South Australian border, taking what was the western half of Namatjira.
Namatjira gained electors from the town of Alice Springs, including the suburbs of Larapinta and Stuart, and parts of Araluen, Braitling, Mount Johns and Sadadeen. To compensate for the influx of Alice Springs electors, the boundaries of Namatjira contracted from the north and transferred to Barkly, and contracted from the west and transferred into Gwoja.

Pendulum

Notes
 This pre-election pendulum is based on post-redistribution estimates of margins calculated by ABC election analyst Antony Green.
 Members listed in italics are retiring at the 2020 election.

Post-election pendulum

Registered parties
At the time of the election, eight parties were registered with the Northern Territory Electoral Commission (NTEC).

 Animal Justice Party
 Australian Labor Party (Northern Territory Branch)
 Ban Fracking Fix Crime Protect Water (formerly 1 Territory Party)
 Country Liberal Party of the Northern Territory

 Federation Party Northern Territory (formerly Australian Country Party)
 NT Greens Inc.
 Shooters and Fishers Party
 Territory Alliance

Opinion polling

Voting intention

Retiring MLAs

Labor
Gerry McCarthy (Barkly) – announced 12 May 2020
Sandra Nelson (Katherine) – announced 20 March 2019

Country Liberal
Gary Higgins (Daly) – announced 20 January 2020

Independent
 Gerry Wood (Nelson) – announced 15 February 2019

Candidates
There were 111 candidates who nominated for the election—the second-highest number of candidates in a Territory election, just under the 115 who nominated in 2016.

Sitting members are listed in bold. Successful candidates are highlighted in the relevant colour. Where there is possible confusion, an asterisk is used.

References

Notes

External links 
 Northern Territory Electoral Commission: 2020 Territory Election 
 ABC Elections: NT Votes 2020

Elections in the Northern Territory
Northern Territory
Northern Territory